Dipodium atropurpureum, commonly known as the purple hyacinth orchid, is a mostly leafless mycoheterotrophic orchid that is endemic to New South Wales. In summer it has up to forty dark pinkish purple to reddish purple flowers with darker spots and blotches on a tall flowering stem.

Description
For most of the year, plants are dormant and have no above-ground presence. The petals are slightly shorter than the sepals and all are free from each other with their tips strongly curved backwards.

Taxonomy and naming
Dipodium atropurpureum was first formally described in 1991 by Australian botanist David Jones and the description was published in Australian Orchid Research. The type specimen was collected east of Walcha in 1987. The specific epithet (atropurpureum) is derived from the Latin words ater meaning "black" and purpura meaning "purple", referring to the dark purple flowers of this orchid.

Distribution and habitat
The purple hyacinth orchid is common on the ranges between Kyogle and Wauchope in northern New South Wales where it grows in open forest with sparse low shrubs.

Ecology
Pollination of this species, as for all species in the genus, is by native bees and wasps.

Cultivation
No leafless species of Dipodium has been sustained in cultivation due to the inability to replicate its association with mycorrhizal fungi in a horticultural context.

References

atropurpureum
Endemic orchids of Australia
Orchids of New South Wales
Plants described in 1991